2001 D1 Grand Prix Point Series

n.b. Winning Driver are mentioned on the right

Round 1 - October 6, 2000 - Ebisu Circuit South Course, Fukushima Prefecture, Japan - Youichi Imamura (AE86)
Round 2 - February 16, 2001 - Nikkō Circuit, Tochigi Prefecture, Japan - Nobuteru Taniguchi (S15)
Round 3 - May 29, 2001 - Bihoku Highland Circuit, Hiroshima Prefecture, Japan - Mitsuru Haruguchi (FC3S)
Round 4 - August 12, 2001 - Ebisu Circuit South Course, Fukushima Prefecture, Japan - Takahiro Ueno (JZZ30)
Round 5 - November 29, 2001 - Nikkō Circuit, Tochigi Prefecture, Japan - Nobuteru Taniguchi (S15)

Final Championship Results

Source: D1GP Official Site 2001 Championship table

See also
 D1 Grand Prix
 Drifting (motorsport)

Sources
D1GP Results Database 2000-2004

D1 Grand Prix seasons
D1 Grand Prix
2001 in Japanese motorsport